The Nottingham Trophy (formerly known as the Aegon Trophy) was an annual tennis tournament played in Nottingham, England. The tournament was part of the ATP Challenger Tour and the International Tennis Federation (ITF Women's Circuit) as a $75,000 event. The tournament's key sponsor was Dutch insurance firm Aegon. The tournament was held at the end of May before the main tour's grass-court season starts.

In 2021, an ATP Challenger Tour and ITF Women's World Tennis Tour event was held in Nottingham, under the name Nottingham Trophy. This event was supposed to be held as the Ilkley Trophy, but moved to Nottingham due to the COVID-19 pandemic.

Location
The tournament is held annually at the Nottingham Tennis Centre within the University Park area of Nottingham.

History
The city used to hold an ATP Tour event, the Nottingham Open; however, due to its failure to attracted big names the tournament was merged with the women's Eastbourne International event in 2009. It was merged with Eastbourne due to the LTA wanting to attract an umbrella sponsor and a younger audience to Eastbourne. However, in December 2008, it was announced that Nottingham would take over from Surbiton, in hosting the grass court ATP Challenger and ITF event. It started in 2009, replacing the Surbiton Trophy due to the renovation of the facilities that had been undertaken at the Nottingham Tennis Centre. The tournament moved back to Surbiton for the 2015 season. A new WTA International competition commenced on 8 June 2015 instead.

Past finals

Men's singles

Women's singles

Men's doubles

Women's doubles

References

External links
 
 

 
ATP Challenger Tour
ITF Women's World Tennis Tour
Grass court tennis tournaments
Tennis tournaments in England
Sport in Nottingham
Recurring sporting events established in 2009
2009 establishments in England
Recurring sporting events disestablished in 2014
2014 disestablishments in England